The Tributaries of the Allegheny River drain western Pennsylvania and part of New York. The following table lists all the named tributaries of the Allegheny River. For each stream, the name, tributary number, coordinate and political subdivision of the confluence, and coordinate of the source are given.

Direct tributaries

Red House Brook

East Sandy Creek

Clarion River

Redbank Creek

North Fork Creek

North Fork Creek is formed by the confluence of Muddy Run and Williams Run in Polk Township, Jefferson County.

Sandy Lick Creek
Sandy Lick Creek

Little Sandy Creek

Mahoning Creek

Pine Run

Cowanshannock Creek

Crooked Creek

Kiskiminetas River

Conemaugh River

Loyalhanna Creek

Blacklegs Creek

Buffalo Creek

See also
 List of tributaries of the Allegheny River

References

 
 
Counties of Appalachia
Rivers of Pennsylvania
Wild and Scenic Rivers of the United States
Allegheny Plateau
Rivers of Armstrong County, Pennsylvania
Rivers of Clarion County, Pennsylvania
Rivers of Elk County, Pennsylvania
Rivers of Forest County, Pennsylvania
Rivers of Indiana County, Pennsylvania
Rivers of Jefferson County, Pennsylvania
Rivers of McKean County, Pennsylvania
Rivers of Venango County, Pennsylvania